Ole Andreas Lilloe-Olsen (27 April 1883 – 29 April 1940) was a Norwegian rifle shooter who competed in the early 20th century in rifle shooting. With his five gold medals and one silver medal, he is the Norwegian athlete with the most medals at the Summer Olympics. He participated in shooting at the 1920 Summer Olympics in Antwerp and won the gold medal in 100 m running deer, double shots and team 100 m running deer, single shots and team 100 m running deer, double shots. At the 1924 Summer Olympics in Paris he defended the Olympic titles in 100 m running deer, double shots and team 100 m running deer, single shots and the silver medal in team 100 m running deer, double shots.

See also
List of multiple Olympic gold medalists

References

External links
Information page about Lilloe-Olsen w/photo 

1883 births
1940 deaths
ISSF rifle shooters
Norwegian male sport shooters
Olympic gold medalists for Norway
Olympic silver medalists for Norway
Olympic shooters of Norway
Shooters at the 1920 Summer Olympics
Shooters at the 1924 Summer Olympics
Olympic medalists in shooting
Medalists at the 1920 Summer Olympics
Medalists at the 1924 Summer Olympics
Sportspeople from Oslo
20th-century Norwegian people